Kory L. Blackwell (born August 3, 1972) is a former American football cornerback who played for the New York Giants and the Cleveland Browns of the National Football League. He played college football at Massachusetts.

College career
Blackwell attended Nassau Community College for two years and was named a Junior College All-American before signing a letter of intent to play at UMass.  While at UMass he was an All-Atlantic 10 Conference selection. Even though he only played with the Minutemen for two seasons Blackwell finished his collegiate career ranked sixth on the schools all-time pass defended list.

Professional career

New York Giants
Blackwell was signed by the New York Giants in 1997 shortly after his college career as an undrafted free agent.  He was invited to training camp and would spend most of the season on the team's practice squad.  In 1998 Blackwell would appear in five games for the Giants mainly on special teams recording three special teams tackles.  In the offseason he was allocated to the Giants NFL Europe team the Scottish Claymores and played in 10 games with the Claymores where he notched 27 tackles, 12 pass defences, eight special teams tackles and three interceptions including one returned for touchdown.

Cleveland Browns
Following the season Blackwell was picked by the Cleveland Browns in the expansion draft.  He spent the season with the Browns appearing primarily on special teams and as a backup cornerback and did not record a tackle.

Oakland Raiders
In 2000 Blackwell would sign on with the Oakland Raiders but was cut during training camp.  He would again play with the Scottish Claymores in NFL Europe and recorded 29 tackles and 7 interception.

Las Vegas Outlaws
For the 2001 season Blackwell would be drafted in the newly formed XFL by the Las Vegas Outlaws with the 21st overall pick in the draft.  He started at cornerback with the Outlaws and recorded 22 tackles and 3 interception on the season. Blackwell appeared in NFL Europe once more this time with the Amsterdam Admirals recording 31 tackles and 2 interception; one returned for a 95-yard touchdown team record.

Jacksonville Jaguars
After the XFL season, Blackwell signed with the Jacksonville Jaguars prior to training camp but was cut in the preseason.

New York Dragons
In 2003, Blackwell was a member of the New York Dragons of the Arena Football League.

Personal life
Kory is married to Sonja Blackwell and has three sons; Karon, Rhyjon and Chey Blackwell.  Kory was a Juvenile Counselor with the New York City Administration for Children's Services, working at Crossroads Juvenile Center and is currently a Probation Officer with the New York City Department Of Probation. At the age of 9, Kory was in a TV commercial with Dallas Cowboys' Herschel Walker.

References

External links
 https://www.pro-football-reference.com/players/B/BlacKo20.htm

1972 births
Living people
Players of American football from New York (state)
African-American players of American football
American football defensive backs
UMass Minutemen football players
New York Giants players
Las Vegas Outlaws (XFL) players
Cleveland Browns players
Oakland Raiders players
Jacksonville Jaguars players
New York Dragons players
Nassau Lions football players
21st-century African-American sportspeople
20th-century African-American sportspeople